Zawisza Czarny is the name of two Polish sailing-ships owned by the Polish Scouting and Guiding Association, ZHP.

History
Zawsisza Czarny used to be a fishing vessel. After that use it was rebuilt to become a sailing vessel. Three masts were fitted on it and the motor that was built in was an old motor from a U-boat.

One of the most interesting sailing voyages is certainly its trip to Cape Horn.

Remarkable are also the sailing trips during which half of the crew consisted of blind people.

It is now owned by the Polish Scouting and Guiding Association, ZHP and its home harbor is Gdynia.

Rig
The rig is one of a very rare kind. The three masts are rigged as a wishbone ketch. Only a few sailing vessels are using it today and it is mainly seen on smaller units.

See also

 Zawisza Czarny

External links
 http://www.zawiszaczarny.pl
 http://www.tallship-fan.de



Tall ships of Poland
Scouting and Guiding in Poland
1952 ships
Fishing in Poland